The Conquest of Kalmar took place on 27 May 1523, during the Swedish War of Liberation (1521-1523). In the beginning of 1523, Kalmar and Stockholm remained as the only real Danish strongholds in Sweden. The situation in Kalmar was tense, with many German Landsknechte mercenaries in Danish hire stationed in the city. They were under orders that, if the city were to be attacked, they should kill all burghers of Swedish origin, burn the city and castle, retreat, and regroup in Visby, Gotland.

When this order became known in the city, the inhabitants quickly made contact with the commanders of the besieging Swedish forces, Arvid Västgöte and Peder Hansson. An agreement was made that the burghers would leave the northern city gate open on the night before 27 May. This was done, and the attack began. Before dawn, the city was in Swedish hands. Eight days later Kalmar Castle surrendered as well, and Arvid Västgöte continued on to cleanse Öland of Danish troops.

References
 

1523 in Europe
Kalmar
Kalmar
Kalmar
16th century in Denmark
1523 in Sweden
1523 in Denmark
Kalmar